The 1954 Wichita Shockers football team was an American football team that represented the University of Wichita (now known as Wichita State University) as a member of the Missouri Valley Conference during the 1954 college football season. In its second and final season under head coach Jack Mitchell, the team compiled a 9–1 record (4–0 against MVC opponents), won the MVC championship, and outscored opponents by a total of 325 to 86. The team played its home games at Veterans Field, now known as Cessna Stadium.

Schedule

References

Wichita
Wichita State Shockers football seasons
Missouri Valley Conference football champion seasons
Wichita Shockers football